Hurricane is an unincorporated community in Washington County, in the U.S. state of Missouri.

It is unknown why the name "Hurricane" was applied to this community.

References

Unincorporated communities in Washington County, Missouri
Unincorporated communities in Missouri